Eros Bolivar "Cy" Barger (May 18, 1885 – September 23, 1964) was a right-handed starting pitcher and left-handed batter who played in the American League for the New York Highlanders (1906–07); in the National League with the Brooklyn teams Superbas (1910) and Dodgers (1911–12), and for the Pittsburgh Rebels (1914–15) in the Federal League.  
 
A native of Jamestown, Kentucky, Barger was a dead-ball era pitcher who also played first base and shortstop as well as the outfield. He went to college at Transylvania University and debuted in the majors on August 30, 1906. With the Highlanders, he had a 0–0 record in 11 innings pitched over parts of two seasons.

In 1909, Barger led Rochester to the Eastern League title with 23 wins and minuscule 1.00 earned run average. Again in the majors with the 1910 Superbas, Barger enjoyed a career year with 15 victories and a 2.88 ERA, winning 11 games the following season. With the Rebels, he won 19 games from 1914 to 1915.

References

External links

 Cy Barger - Baseballbiography.com

1885 births
1964 deaths
Major League Baseball pitchers
Brooklyn Dodgers players
Brooklyn Superbas players
New York Highlanders players
Pittsburgh Rebels players
Binghamton Bingoes players
Lancaster Red Roses players
Louisville Colonels (minor league) players
Memphis Chickasaws players
Montreal Royals players
Newark Indians players
Rochester Bronchos players
Kentucky Wildcats baseball coaches
Transylvania Pioneers baseball players
People from Jamestown, Kentucky
Baseball players from Kentucky